Poison is a 2019 Indian Hindi-language action crime thriller web series that is streaming on ZEE5. The 11-episode web series is written by Shiraz Ahmed and directed by Jatin Wagle. It stars Arbaaz Khan, Riya Sen, Freddy Daruwala and Tanuj Virwani. The series is Arbaaz Khan's digital debut.

Synopsis 
Ranveer (Tanuj) completes his prison sentence for a crime he didn't commit. He sets out to Goa in a quest for revenge. Vikram (Freddy) is a DSP who aspires to become the police commissioner and sets out to nab Antonio Verghese (Arbaaz), a don who operates from Goa. What happens when the lives of these three men entwine with each other forms the crux of the series.

Cast 

 Tanuj Virwani as Ranveer
 Freddy Daruwala as DSP Vikram
 Arbaaz Khan as Antonio Verghese
 Riya Sen as Natasha
 Pankaj Dheer as Barrister D’Costa
 Romit Raj as Jai Dixit
 Archanna Guptaa as Megha
 Ruhani Sharma as Jhanvi
 Pranati Rai Prakash as Ashu
 Saakshi Pradhan as Rani
 Gaurav Sharma as Pawan
 Bikramjeet Kanwarpal as Commissioner
 Darshan Gokani as Jacob 
 Faisal Rashid as Inspector

Production 
Poison was one of the 72 shows that were announced at ZEE5's first-anniversary event in February 2019. However, reports about the series’ cast were being made as early as January 2019. The series marks the second collaboration between Arbaaz Khan and ZEE5, after the webcast of his talk show, Pinch. Along with Arbaaz Khan, actor Freddy Daruwala also makes his digital debut with this series.

Zee5 announced the second season Poison 2 which released on 16 October 2020.

Episodes

References

External links

Official Website STREAMING NOW at ZEE5

ZEE5 original programming
Indian television shows
Indian web series
Hindi-language television shows
2019 Indian television series debuts